Nemapogon variatella is a moth of the family Tineidae. It is found in almost all of Europe. It is also found in North America.

The wingspan is about 12 mm.

The larvae feed on bracket fungus or dead wood, and possibly on dried grain or stored produce. Recorded food includes Coriolus versicolor, Laetiporus sulphureus and Polyporus squamosus.

Synonyms
 Nemapogon apicisignatella (Dietz, 1905)
 Nemapogon fulvisuffusella (Dietz, 1905)
 Nemapogon personella (Pierce & Metcalfe, 1934)
 Nemapogon variatellus (lapsus)
 Tinea infimella Corbet, 1943 (non Herrich-Schäffer, 1851: preoccupied, name now refers to N. cloacella )
 Tinea personella Pierce & Metcalfe, 1934
 Tinea secalella Zacher, 1938
 Tinea variatella Clemens, 1859

References

External links
Fauna Europaea
UKmoths
Images

Nemapogoninae
Moths of Europe
Moths of North America
Moths described in 1859